The 2016 CAF Super Cup (officially the 2016 Orange CAF Super Cup for sponsorship reasons) was the 24th CAF Super Cup, an annual football match in Africa organized by the Confederation of African Football (CAF), between the winners of the previous season's two CAF club competitions, the CAF Champions League and the CAF Confederation Cup.

The match was played between TP Mazembe of the Democratic Republic of the Congo, the 2015 CAF Champions League winner, and Étoile du Sahel of Tunisia, the 2015 CAF Confederation Cup winner. It was hosted by TP Mazembe at the Stade TP Mazembe in Lubumbashi on 20 February 2016.

TP Mazembe defeated Étoile du Sahel 2–1 to win the competition for the third time in its history.

Teams

Rules
The CAF Super Cup was played as a single match, with the CAF Champions League winner hosting the match. If the score was tied at the end of regulation, extra time would not be played, and the penalty shoot-out would be used to determine the winner (CAF Champions League Regulations XXVII and CAF Confederation Cup Regulations XXV).

Match

Prize money

The winner earned $75k USD and the runner-up received $50k USD.

References

External links
Orange CAF Super Cup 2016, CAFonline.com

2016
Super
TP Mazembe matches
Étoile Sportive du Sahel matches
International club association football competitions hosted by the Democratic Republic of the Congo